Sirretta Peak is a mountain located in the southern Sierra Nevada in California. The high elevation means that most of the precipitation the mountain receives is snow.

See also 
 Sequoia National Forest

Further reading

References

External links
 
 
 

Mountains of the Sierra Nevada (United States)
Mountains of Tulare County, California
Mountains of Northern California